Love Mysterious is the fourth solo album by house DJ Kaskade. It was released on September 26, 2006 by Ultra Records.

The first single from the album, "Be Still", reached #4 on Billboard Magazine’s Hot Dance Club Play chart. The single features vocalist Sunsun and includes remixes by Jay-J and Robbie Rivera. The follow-up single "Stars Align" hit number #8 on "Billboard Magazine" Hot Dance Airplay chart and just missed the top ten at #11 on the Hot Dance Club Play chart. The fourth single "Sorry" was his third consecutive top ten hit on Billboard's Hot Dance Airplay Chart, at #9. Dirty South provided a remix for "Sorry". The remix was nominated for a 2008 Grammy for Best Remixed Recording.

Track listing

Note: The track listing of the American CD release is the same, but the tracks appear in a different order to those listed (specifically tracks 2-9).

Personnel
 Ryan Raddon - Producer, Writer
 Finn Bjarnson - Producer (All tracks), Writer (All tracks), Vocals ("Sorry" and "The X")
 Andy Caldwell - Additional Production ("Sorry" and "The X")
 John Hancock - Additional Production ("Sometimes")
 Marcus Bentley - Vocals ("Stars Align" and "Sometimes")
 Sunsun - Vocals ("Be Still")
 Mark Phillips - Guitar ("Be Still")
 Joslyn Petty (Joslyn) - Vocals ("In This Life", "Distance", "Fake", and "Never Ending")
 Chuck Love - Trumpet ("Distance")
 Craig Poole - Bass ("Distance")
 Becky Jean Williams - Vocals ("All You" and "4 AM")
 Haley Gibby (Haley) - Vocals ("Arrival")

References

2006 albums
Kaskade albums